Novoyanbayevo (Yañı Yanbay) is a rural locality (a village) in Staroyanbayevsky Selsoviet, Baltachevsky District, Bashkortostan, Russia. The population was 2 as of 2010. There are 3 streets.

Geography 
Novoyanbayevo is located 36 km southeast of Starobaltachevo (the district's administrative centre) by road. Mishkino is the nearest rural locality.

References 

Rural localities in Baltachevsky District